Hand in Hand International is a registered non-profit organisation based in London, UK. It is part of the Hand in Hand network, whose shared vision is to fight poverty through job and business creation. Hand in Hand was founded by Percy Barnevik and Dr Kalpana Sankar.

Hand in Hand’s mission is to work for the economic and social empowerment of the poorest and most marginalized people by helping women beat the odds and succeed as entrepreneurs. Since 2003, the Hand in Hand network has helped start and sustain 3 million businesses and generated 4.5 million jobs.  Hand in Hand works in the same field as BRAC, Opportunity International, CARE, Bill & Melinda Gates Foundation and Aga Khan Foundation.

History 

The story of Hand in Hand begin in the late 1980s with two Swedish teachers – Olle and Gunnel Blomqvist – visiting the district of Kancheepuram. Children traditionally constituted a cheap source of labour for the weaving industry in Kancheepuram, and parents who did not have permanent jobs would send their children to master weavers. Bringing such children out of labour was Hand in Hand's initial focus. 

At the end of 1990 the Blomqvists came in contact with Percy Barnevik, who became a sponsor to the organization. Barnevik was interested in the teachers' work in India.

Hand in Hand India was founded in 2003 by Barnevik and Dr Kalpana Sankar in the Indian state of Tamil Nadu. The Hand in Hand network has operated programs in 10 countries across Asia (Afghanistan, India, Cambodia and Myanmar) and East Africa (Kenya and Rwanda).

Hand in Hand receives funding from a number of different sources including individuals, corporations, bi-lateral and multi-lateral institutions and trusts and foundations. Recent supporters include the FMO, Sida, Johnson & Johnson Corporate Citizenship Trust, Nationale Postcode Loterij and Voxtra (philanthropic foundation based in Oslo, Norway). Hand in Hand Afghanistan also received a US $1.16 million (€840 K) grant from the European Union.

In 2007, Hand in Hand Afghanistan was set up with Seema Ghani as chair. On 19 February 2014, Ghani gave an interview with the BBC about the economic challenges facing Afghanistan and how job creation will help solve many of the challenges. She also gave an interview to Forbes magazine regarding the positive effect of micro-businesses on Afghanistan.

Since 2011, Hand in Hand has organised an annual Social Enterprise Program (SEP). The course showcases the role of social entrepreneurs in reducing poverty.

As of 2021, Hand in Hand International's board of trustees included Bruce Grant (Chair), Dr John Barrett, Dr Madhvi Chanrai, Carsten Jorgensen, Lars G Josefsson, Paola Uggla and Stephanie Whittier.

In 2013, Hand in Hand launched the Enterprise Incubation Fund (EIF), through which philanthropists can provide loans to micro-entrepreneurs in Kenya.

Hand in Hand network 

The organizations within the Hand in Hand group actively support each other, although they are independent and each organization has its own governance and management structure as well as strategic plan. Each organization is represented by its CEO on the Hand in Hand Global Council. The Global Council coordinates policy and activities across the Hand in Hand network.

Today, the Hand in Hand network extends to:
Hand in Hand India
Hand in Hand Eastern Africa
Hand in Hand Afghanistan
Hand in Hand International 
Hand in Hand Sweden
Hand in Hand Zimbabwe 

The network has support and fundraising offices in London, Stockholm and New York.

Job creation model 

The Hand in Hand network uses a comprehensive business creation model, initially developed by Hand in Hand India, to fight poverty. There are four interlinked elements that deliver the Hand in Hand approach:
 Social mobilization: Hand in Hand helps organize people, mostly women, into Self-Help Groups (SHGs), who meet weekly with their trainers to discuss social issues and activities. Together, they begin to save money, learn financial discipline and build up group savings funds for which they are jointly responsible.
 Business training: Once a group has demonstrated stability and financial responsibility, Hand in Hand provides business training in how to start, grow and sustain a small enterprise and become an entrepreneur.
 Credit access: Most groups hold joint savings in local savings accounts and learn how to manage these. Should financial resources be required beyond group members’ own savings, members are trained in credit management and offered small loans, either directly or through partners active in their area.
 Market linkage support: Hand in Hand provides support in improving productivity and competitiveness, including advice on better packaging, pricing and branding; cheaper sourcing of supplies; quality control; reliable delivery; and more effective identification of and negotiation with buyers.

Awards 
Hand in Hand International's work has won numerous awards, including:

 National Fundraising Award
 Bond Outstanding Individual Award, Seema Ghani
 Charity Awards, International Aid and Development Category, honorable mention

Hand in Hand International has also been recognized for its range of employee benefits, including work-from-home Fridays, extended parental leave and more.

Results 

Globally, Hand in Hand has generated 3 million million businesses and 4.5 million jobs. An independent report published in 2012 confirmed that 97.4% of the jobs are sustainable. Another report published in 2019 found that 80% of businesses were still operational a year after Hand in Hand programs concluded.

To date, Hand in Hand Afghanistan has enabled 45,000 people to join groups as a first step to working their way out of poverty, and generated more than 42,000 jobs in rural, remote parts of the country. Hand in Hand Eastern Africa has generated 400,000 jobs, and Hand in Hand India has generated 3.7 million jobs. In most countries in which the network operates, Hand in Hand has achieved sizable reach with its Self-Help Groups in comparison to other established NGOs.

References

External links 
Hand in Hand International website
Hand in Hand India website
Hand in Hand Eastern Africa website
Hand in Hand Afghanistan information
Hand in Hand, registered Charity no. 1113868 at the Charity Commission
Hand in Hand in City A.M
What Do We Really, Really Want From the G7 Meeting?

Development charities based in the United Kingdom